Cardiff Rugby is one of the four professional Welsh rugby union teams. They compete in the United Rugby Championship and in European Professional Club Rugby competitions.

Based in Cardiff, the team play at Cardiff Arms Park and are the professional arm of Cardiff Rugby Ltd. From 2003 to 2021 the first team was known as the Cardiff Blues before rebranding to Cardiff Rugby prior to the start of the 2021-22 season.

They won European Challenge Cup titles in 2010 and 2018, beating Toulon Rugby and Gloucester Rugby respectively. They most recently made the knockout stages of the European Rugby Champions Cup in 2012.

Between 2005 and 2018, they also competed in the Anglo-Welsh Cup and won the 2009 title, beating Gloucester at Twickenham.

History

Origins 

The first reliably recorded Rugby club in Cardiff were Tredegarville, who began playing around 1870. By 1874 a team named Glamorgan FC had been formed and in 1876 they merged with Cardiff Wanderers to form Cardiff RFC.

Over the next 119 years, Cardiff RFC would become one of British rugby's leading clubs. In 1885 under Frank Hancock, Cardiff began playing with seven backs and eight forwards and perfected what was known at the time as "the passing game". These innovations eventually spread throughout the rugby world and in 2011 earned the club a place in the World Rugby Hall of Fame, one of only three clubs to have this honour. Several former Cardiff players including Gwyn Nicholls, Bleddyn Williams, Cliff Morgan, Gareth Edwards, Barry John and Gerald Davies are also members of the Hall of Fame.

In 1922, after purchasing Cardiff Arms Park, Cardiff RFC and Cardiff Cricket Club would form the Cardiff Athletic Club.

In the amateur era, Cardiff would record victories over South Africa and New Zealand. Australia would fail to beat them on six occasions. They provided more Welsh and British Lions internationals than any other club and, at the dawn of professionalism, made the first Heineken Cup final.

Professionalism and the reorganisation of Welsh rugby 
When Rugby Union turned professional in 1995, Welsh rugby was organised in a league pyramid, at the top of which was the Premier Division of twelve teams that had existed for over a century as amateur clubs. However, it became clear over the next few seasons that under professionalism, Welsh Rugby would need to find a new structure.

In 1996 Cardiff Athletic Club had created Cardiff Rugby Ltd to run its professional rugby team, with former player and successful businessman Peter Thomas its first Chairman – a position he would continue to hold for the next 23 years. Cardiff were among the clubs pushing hard for the creation of an Anglo Welsh or British League in the late 1990s, which would put them in frequent conflict with the Welsh Rugby Union. This culminated in the "rebel season" of 1998/99. Thomas would refer to the WRU as "an amateur body living in the dark ages."

The next few seasons saw multiple plans for the future of Welsh professional rugby put forward. A solution known as the "gang of six" proposal also included Cardiff but was defeated by a vote of the 237 WRU member clubs.

By 2002, after years of financial problems and bitter wrangling, nine clubs remained at the top of the Welsh game. A solution was finally accepted by new WRU CEO David Moffett and it was agreed that five teams would take part in future professional competitions.

Cardiff and Llanelli were to be "standalone" teams, meaning that they would not have to amalgamate with any of the other professional clubs.

After a period of considering different names including "Cardiff 76ers" and "Cardiff Blue and Blacks", Cardiff settled on "Cardiff Blues".

Dai Young years

Difficult first seasons
Dai Young had first been appointed Head Coach at the Arms Park in 2002, after the early departure of South African coach Rudy Joubert. Since his return from rugby league in 1996, Young had played in Cardiff teams that had won the 1999-2000 Welsh-Scottish League title, and had played in the latter stages of the Heineken Cup every season (apart from the 1998/99 "rebel season") until 2001/02.

But over the two seasons running up to what became known as Welsh rugby's "regionalisation", cut backs had been made at the Arms Park and high profile players like Gareth Thomas, Jonathan Humphreys, Rob Howley and Neil Jenkins had left. Nevertheless, the first squad as Cardiff Blues could still call on quality Welsh internationals like Rhys Williams, Tom Shanklin, Iestyn Harris and Martyn Williams, who would compete for Wales at the 2003 Rugby World Cup. Popular Canadian forward Dan Baugh and veteran South African centre Pieter Muller also remained at the club.

Aside from these few star names, the first squad under the Cardiff Blues brand was largely made up of lesser known players. Some like Nicky Robinson, his brother Jamie Robinson, Robin Sowden-Taylor and T Rhys Thomas would go on to become key figures at Cardiff. Another notable player was Cardiff fireman and part time rugby player Lee Abdul. After being brought into the squad as cover during the 2003 Rugby World Cup, Abdul would score a record four tries from the wing against the Ospreys before his career was cut short by injury.

Young's first season as a coach had been disappointing, and the first season as Cardiff Blues similarly frustrated fans. Increasingly, there were calls for Young to step down and these calls would continue for the next few seasons. However, the Cardiff board would stand by Young.

After the demise of the Celtic Warriors in 2004, the Cardiff Blues region was expanded to include Rhondda Cynon Taff, Merthyr and South Powys. Cardiff Blues would also sign players made redundant by the scrapping of the Warriors, including Gethin Jenkins and Robert Sidoli.

Calls for Young to be removed intensified between November 2004 and January 2005 when the team went eight games without recording a victory. Following the 15–38 loss to Stade Français the players were booed from the field by their own supporters.

Finishing in 9th position in the 2004-05 Celtic League meant that to qualify for the Heineken Cup, Cardiff had to compete in a play-off game against the third place Italian side Arix Viadana. Cardiff Blues won this game 38–9, thus qualifying for the Heineken Cup through what the media described derisively as the cat flap.

Investment, signings and rebuilding

In the summer of 2005 funds were made available to sign new players allowing Dai Young to start rebuilding the side. Former New Zealand No.8 Xavier Rush was among several new signings who gave the squad a much stronger look. Also, a new custom-built training headquarters was established at Hensol in the outskirts of Cardiff.

Results did not improve immediately, with the 37–20 win over Saracens in October 2005 the highlight of a mixed start to the season. However, in a prematch announcement it was confirmed that rugby legend Jonah Lomu had agreed to join on a temporary, "pay as you play" basis as he tried to rebuild his career in time for the 2007 Rugby World Cup.

Lomu was recovering from a kidney transplant, but the signing gave notice of the team's renewed ambition. His home debut versus Calvisano was greeted by a capacity crowd and the signing was regarded as a marketing masterstroke. Results improved with wins over the Ospreys and the Newport Gwent Dragons in December.

In January 2006, Cardiff Blues were knocked out of the Heineken Cup after losing 3–21 at home to Perpignan and then losing 3–48 to the relegation threatened Leeds Tykes.  The poor run prompted the management to issue "final warnings" to under performing players. As had been the case in the two previous seasons, results improved in the latter months of the season, and in May, 15,327 watched Cardiff Blues beat Leinster 40–31 at the Millennium Stadium. At the time it set a new record for the highest attendance recorded for any Celtic League match.

New optimism
More signings, including former New Zealand fullback Ben Blair, alongside some talented academy graduates (notably Bradley Davies and Tom James) further enhanced the quality of the Cardiff Blues squad for the 2006–07 season.

In the Heineken Cup, Cardiff Blues recorded their first win in France, beating Bourgoin 13–5. Encouraged by the strong attendance for the previous season's Leinster clash, the Millennium Stadium was again used. This time hosting Leicester Tigers were the opposition and the match attracted a crowd of 26,309 spectators.

In the Celtic League, performances were now much improved. Cardiff finished second after having beaten Leinster at home to go top, only for the Ospreys to win at Borders the next day to claim the title.

Further big signings were added to the Cardiff Blues squad over the summer of 2007 including the return of Gareth Thomas, plus Paul Tito and Jason Spice. However the season was hit by the lengthy absence of important playmaker Nicky Robinson. For the second season in a row, Cardiff Blues finished second in the Celtic League and were eliminated at the pool stage of the Anglo Welsh Cup, despite taking Bath's 12 month unbeaten home record.

But in Europe, Cardiff made the quarter finals of the Heineken Cup after recording two wins over Bristol, a win and a draw with Harlequins and a rousing home victory over Stade Francais at the pool stage. They lost their away quarter-final to Toulouse but returning to the knockout stages of the tournament was seen a major step forward for Dai Young's team.

Anglo Welsh Triumph and Heineken Cup Heartbreak

By the 2008/09 season, Young's squad had a settled look, with few new signings. The team would finish only 6th in the Celtic League, but the club's focus on cup competitions would see them win the Anglo Welsh Cup final 50–12 against Gloucester at Twickenham and make the semi finals of the Heineken Cup. The Heineken Cup campaign began with a 20–56 bonus point victory away to Calvisano. before another a bonus point 37–24 win against Gloucester at the Millennium Stadium before a crowd of 27,114. The Cardiff Blues then claimed back-to-back victories over Biarritz in December, winning 21–17 at home followed by a 6–10 victory away.

Following the Christmas break, an away 12–16 victory over Gloucester was recorded despite being reduced to 14 men after Tom James was sent-off for a head butt on Gloucester hooker Olivier Azam. In the final round of pool games a bonus point 62–20 win over Calvisano ensured that Cardiff Blues remained the only unbeaten team in the pool stages of the 2008–09 Heineken Cup and claimed the top seed position and a home quarter-final.

The quarter-final against eighth seed and three-times Heineken Cup winners Toulouse was played in the Millennium Stadium with another record attendance of 36,778. A 9–6 victory was recorded in a defence dominated game. The semi-final against Leicester Tigers was also hosted at the Millennium Stadium. Despite being 12–26 down with six minutes remaining, a mighty comeback tied the scores at 26–26 after 80 minutes and forced extra time.

With no further score in the 20 minutes of extra time, the game was forced into an historic penalty shootout. Cardiff were defeated 7–6 following missed kicks by Tom James and Martyn Williams.

Cardiff City Stadium
Despite the excitement on the field, off the field a drama had been playing out as the Cardiff Blues board put in place a plan to move from their historic home at Cardiff Arms Park and into the new Cardiff City Stadium. Supporters were alarmed by the supposed rental costs involved in using the new venue as well as moving away from what they regarded as their spiritual home.

More big name signings were made upon the move to the new stadium, including Casey Laulala and Sam Norton-Knight. Norton-Knight had the job of replacing fan favourite outside half Nicky Robinson who, along with his brother Jamie Robinson had chosen to leave Cardiff Blues that summer. However, Norton-Knight would struggle in the 10 shirt and would go down as Dai Young's biggest transfer mistake.

In the Celtic League, Cardiff Blues finished fifth in the table, one point away from the playoffs; but secured a place in the 2010–11 Heineken Cup as the second-placed Welsh team. Their Heineken Cup campaign ended after the pool stage, in which they finished second to Toulouse and were not one of the two top second-place teams.

However, this season was the first in which three-second-place teams from the Heineken Cup parachuted into the European Challenge Cup, and the Cardiff Blues were one of three teams to qualify. They crushed Newcastle Falcons 55–22 in the quarterfinals, and edged London Wasps 18–15 both on the road, to reach the final of the competition. The Cardiff Blues became the first Welsh side to win a European trophy after beating Toulon 28–21 in the final on 23 May at Stade Vélodrome in Marseille.

Off the field, the Cardiff Blues had a turnover of £8.7 million and a total employment bill of £5.6 million, with other costs including rental of the new stadium leading them to make a loss of more than £650,000.

Xavier Rush chose to sign a new contract with the club, despite having earlier agreed terms with Ulster. After a "change in his personal circumstances" Rush had decided to remain at the club he described as his "home from home" and a release from his two year contract was negotiated with Ulster.

Further signings were made. Michael Paterson joined from the Super 14 side the Hurricanes. Press reports in New Zealand at the time of the signing indicated that he had been close to selection for the All-Blacks before choosing to join Cardiff. With the unsuccessful Sam Norton-Knight signing for the Sanyo Wild Knights after not making the grade at outside half, Dan Parks of Glasgow Warriors and a Scottish International was signed.

But the team were beginning to struggle on the field. They were runners up in their Heineken Cup pool but with not enough points to progress in either the Heineken or the Amlin Cups. In the Pro 12 they slipped to sixth place, missing out on a play-off spot.

Lower attendances and a failure to progress in either the Heineken Cup or Magners League meant turnover fell to £7.4m, while added player and coaching costs led to the total employment bill rising to £6.7m. The hefty financial costs attached to playing at Cardiff City Stadium were beginning to mount.

In June 2011, Dai Young would step down in order to join Wasps RFC, bringing an end to nine years as Head Coach and Director of Rugby after a playing career that had begun in 1988.

Return to the Arms Park 
Dai Young's departure had coincided with financial losses at the Cardiff City Stadium beginning to bite. No new signings were made over the summer and Young's assistant coaches, Gareth Baber and Justin Burnell, were made caretaker coaches.

Mid season, long serving Chief Executive Robert Norster also left, to be replaced by Richard Holland. Gavin Henson would be signed on a short term contract, only for it to be cancelled after an incident on an aircraft returning from a match in Scotland.

Despite some success in the Heineken Cup, beating Racing Metro and achieving a quarter final place, this was a season in which Cardiff Blues managed only 10 league wins. The season was marked by increased awareness of the impact financial pressures were having on the team since the move to Cardiff City Stadium.

The team would lose £3.83m over the 2011/12 season including a seven figure payment to cancel their lease agreement with Cardiff City. It was estimated that the rental agreement and other costs associated with using the stadium had been costing the club around £1 million a season.

Attendances declined further and supporters expressed their dissatisfaction. Two fixtures were moved back to Cardiff Arms Park with some success. The games against Connacht on 10 February 2012 and Ulster on 17 February 2012 achieved capacity crowds and proved popular with supporters.

It was decided that the team would return to Cardiff Arms Park permanently.

Phil Davies and "The Chief"
Upon returning to the Arms Park, the Cardiff Blues board decided that an experienced Director of Rugby was needed. Former Scarlets coach Phil Davies was appointed.

Over the next two seasons a number of long serving and high profile players would retire or leave for other clubs, including Gethin Jenkins, T Rhys Thomas, Casey Laulala Ben Blair Martyn Williams, Xavier Rush, Paul Tito, Maama Molitika Deiniol Jones Jamie Roberts Michael Paterson Tom James Leigh Halfpenny Ceri Sweeney and Bradley Davies.

In Davies's first season Cardiff Blues managed only eight wins in the Pro12 and one in the Heineken Cup. They scored a mere 28 tries in the Pro12, the lowest in the league.

Problems with the Arms Park playing surface had also been an issue during the season. Over the following summer, money was invested in a new artificial playing surface.

Davies chose to appoint a diverse range of assistants. These included the 1980s Cardiff hero Mark Ring, Pontypridd icon Dale McIntosh (nicknamed "The Chief") and young former London Broncos coach Rob Powell. Ring's methods were regarded as outdated and Paul John instead came on board as the new backs coach.

After a home loss to Italian club Zebre and a heavy defeat in the Heineken Cup to Exeter, Phil Davies came under severe scrutiny and defence coach Powell promptly left the club. However a victory over Heineken Cup champions Toulon followed by back to back wins over Glasgow briefly eased pressure on Davies. A further series  of league defeats proved to be the final straw and Davies finally resigned. The remaining six matches of the season saw caretaker coaches John and McIntosh take the team on a four match unbeaten run which belatedly improved the team's league position.

Stay Strong for Ows
In June 2014, Cardiff were invited to send a squad to Singapore to compete in the inaugural World Club 10s. Tragically, during a third place play off match, young Cardiff centre Owen Williams suffered a significant injury to his cervical vertebrae and spinal cord. The injury ended Williams's rugby career and left him paralysed from the waist down.

Soon after the incident, the social media hashtag #staystrongforows became popularised and Williams received support from around the world. Fundraising efforts managed to secure for Williams a purpose built house and the Stay Strong For Ows Foundation has continued to raise money and draw attention to the plight of players, who experience life changing injuries.

Mark Hammett
For the 2014/15 season, increased financial stability following the return to the Arms Park saw the board once more invest in the playing and coaching staff. 
Jarrad Hoeata and Gareth Anscombe were signed from New Zealand, and off the field, Kiwi coach Mark Hammett arrived after a controversial period coaching the Hurricanes in Super Rugby to become the new Director of Rugby.

Hammett's brief period in charge of the club was marked by unusual selections, insistence that players improve their fitness levels and frequent stories in the press about player dissatisfaction with his approach. Hammett would return to New Zealand before the end of the season, with "The Chief" and Paul John once more taking charge as caretaker coaches through to the end of the season.

Danny Wilson years 
After three chaotic seasons, Cardiff were once again looking for a new coach. They now turned to the Bristol Bears assistant Danny Wilson. Wilson had begun his coaching career in the Cardiff Blues academy and had established a strong reputation as a forward specialist, and as Wales U20s Head coach. Dale McIntosh - who had applied for the job himself - would leave soon after and be replaced as defence coach by former rugby league man Graham Steadman.

Billy Millard, who had been backs coach under Dai Young, also returned to take up the role of General Manager, a role designed to enable Wilson to focus on hand on coaching over "desk work".

Wilson found himself having to rebuild a squad that by then was a hotch potch of signings from various coaches. His team initially went on a nine match losing run. But in the second half of the season, Wilson had begun turning the team's fortunes around. An impressive away win against Scarlets was the high point in a run of strong performances that suggested Wilson was bringing much needed stability to the club. For his second season, Wilson was able to add strong new signings like Willis Halaholo and Nick Williams as well as replace Paul John with his former Bristol colleague Matt Sherratt.

Wilson also began bringing through a group of highly promising young players from the academy, including Rhun Williams, Seb Davies, Jarrod Evans and Tomos Williams.

Second season injury crisis
However, after a promising start to Wilson's second season, the team experienced a raft of injuries, beginning with a serious injury to fan favourite Dan Fish which would keep him out of rugby for much of the next three years. Key players including star outside half Anscombe, and much of the club's stable of backrow talents were also made unavailable through injury.

Nicky Robinson was called out of retirement as an emergency outside half signing and Sion Bennett also had to be signed as an emergency openside flanker due to the number of injuries in what was considered Cardiff Blues's strongest position.

Wilson's second season had proven to be disappointing. But as players returned from injury, performances (particularly a thumping 35-17 win over the Ospreys) once again began to improve toward end of season. Wilson looked to add experience to the squad and brought in South African Franco van der Merwe to strengthen the problematic second row position.

Decision to leave
Since returning to the Arms Park, the Cardiff Blues board had been negotiating with their main shareholder and landlord the Cardiff Athletic Club, over terms for a new lease at the Arms Park which would allow the board to put in place ambitious plans to redevelop the site and modernise the stadium.

These talks suddenly collapsed in 2017, leading to a sudden reduction in the wage bill at the Arms Park. This led to the recently arrived Van Der Merwe having to find a new club without playing a single match. Billy Millard also departed. Wilson was now having to fulfil Millard's former role alongside the Head Coach job, and also had only Sherratt and Richard Hodges alongside him as assistant coaches.

Wilson announced his decision to turn down the opportunity to stay at the Arms Park beyond the 2017/18 season. Initially he was set to join Wasps, ironically alongside Dai Young, but later would announce his decision to join Scotland as their new forwards coach.

Amlin Cup triumph
Wilson was a popular coach with the fans and announcement of his departure was greeted with frustration. The pessimistic mood was not helped by a series of poor results in the first half of the season.

In the second half of the season, once again performances turned around. After a run of strong displays in the Pro12, Wilson's team all but assured a return to Champions Cup rugby with a bonus point win over Ulster. Meanwhile, a strong campaign in the Challenge Cup, including away wins at Toulouse and Lyon, had seen them into the latter stages of that competition.

After a semi final win over Pau before a packed Arms Park, Cardiff Blues faced Gloucester at the final in Bilbao. A second half comeback and late penalty from Anscombe secured a dramatic win.

John Mulvihill years 
The Cardiff Blues board struggled to replace Wilson. Geordan Murphy and Jim Mallinder were both reported to be close to securing the job but in the event did not take the role. The job eventually went to little known Australian coach John Mulvihill, who had spent much of his career coaching in Japan. Mulvihill had been highly recommended by Alec Evans, who had been a highly successful and respected coach at the Arms Park in the 1990s.

Mulvihill assembled a new coaching team of mostly young Welsh coaches recommended to him by the WRU. However his late arrival meant that Mulvihill was unable to make many changes to the playing squad. His first season included some notable wins over the Scarlets and Lyon and a narrow defeat to English giants Saracens, but after a mixed season Cardiff Blues had narrowly failed to remain in the Champions Cup for the following year.

Project reset
Off field, The WRU and Welsh professional teams had been negotiating over "Project reset", which had been intended to improve relations between the teams and the union, as well as change the way Welsh professional rugby was funded. However, these talks led to the sudden imposition of a transfer embargo for much of the 2019/20 season.

The embargo meant that although Mulvihill had secured the high profile signings of Hallam Amos and Josh Adams for the following season, he was unable to strengthen his forward pack. The embargo also meant that Cardiff Blues could not offer a new contract to breakthrough academy prop Rhys Carre, who would as a result take up an offer from Saracens.

Changes at boardroom level
The "Reset" talks also resulted in major changes and a process of modernisation at board level. Peter Thomas stepped down after twenty years as Chairman and became Life President while remaining on the board. Thomas would also write off £14 million pounds of loans he'd made to the club since 1996. Fellow investor Martyn Ryan also wrote off a near seven figure sum. Long term board members Gareth Edwards and Paul Bailey also stepped aside to become Life Patrons.

The new Chairman was Managing Partner of Law Firm Hugh James, Alun Jones and experienced business people Andrew Williams  and Hayley Parsons would also join the board in the first major changes to the Cardiff Rugby Ltd board since its creation in 1997. Three years later, David Allen would become the board's first supporter advisor.

Covid 19
Mulvihill's second season continued the mixed set of results experienced in his first season. This season was however to be curtailed by the COVID-19 pandemic. As with every other professional sports team, Cardiff Blues's future was now in jeopardy. Planning for future seasons was also curtailed with Mulvihill once again being unable to recruit significantly. As part of negotiations over necessary wage cuts, extended contracts were handed out to squad members.

Mulvihill remained in charge for the following season, which was to be played behind closed doors as the pandemic continued. With the Arms Park used as part of the Dragons Heart emergency hospital, Cardiff played home games at Rodney Parade in Newport as well as two matches back at Cardiff City Stadium.

Two and half years of taking charge of Cardiff Blues through an unprecedented level of off field disruption came to an end for Mulvihill on New Years Day 2021, when he left the club to return to his family in Australia.

Return of Dai Young 
Young had ended his lengthy stay at Wasps early in 2020. Aware that he was now available, the Cardiff Blues board saw him as an ideal replacement for the departing Mulvihill. He signed an initial short term contract, followed by a longer term one in April 2021.

Young improved the team's fortunes and secured a return to Champions Cup rugby with a defeat of Edinburgh. Like his predecessor, off field issues meant that he was unable to substantially change his squad.

Rebranding

On March 1, 2021, following discussions with supporter groups, the club announced a rebranding to Cardiff Rugby, dropping the Blues name and logo from August 1, 2021.

Chief Executive Richard Holland clarified the club's identity, explaining that "We are a club with regional responsibilities....There has always been this question mark over what purpose Blues serves. It’s a suffix, at the end of the day, to Cardiff. This change is reaffirming who we are and being proud of that, while still continuing our regional duties. We believe it’s the right decision. It’s an exciting development for us as a company where we embrace the rich history and heritage of ourselves as a club."

Holland also clarified the position of the Cardiff RFC Premiership team after the rebrand, "Cardiff Rugby is the over-arching brand that’s going to encompass the pro team and the semi-pro team... Cardiff, as the Rags team, will play in the Premiership. There is no change with that." "

"Rags" was a reference to the traditional nickname for the Cardiff second XV. Following the rebrand, academy manager Gruff Rees became Director of Rugby of the Cardiff RFC XV and began a process Rees described as "full alignment with our academy".

Chairman Alun Jones further clarified, "What the rebrand does is to re-connect with our history. It’s about having a clear identity."

The Champions Cup "Misfits"

Cardiff's 2021/22 season had begun steadily, with three wins and two close defeats in their first five URC matches. After the autumn internationals, the squad flew to South Africa for matches against the Lions and Stormers.

While there, news of the Omicron Variant of Covid19's spread in South Africa forced the postponement of the matches. The entire squad was forced into quarantine, initially in South Africa and later at airport hotels in England.

Champions Cup matches against French champions Stade Toulousain and English champions Harlequins were now in doubt as Cardiff seemed unlikely to be able to raise a team from the few players who hadn't flown to South Africa. A total of 32 players and 10 members of staff had been on the trip and an additional 10 players were either injured or suspended.

Cardiff made the decision to fulfill the fixtures nevertheless. Gruff Rees was put in temporary charge of the team. In addition to the few players that had been left at home, he called upon members of the Cardiff RFC semi pro squad and added two experienced semi pro props from Aberavon RFC

The team Rees dubbed his "misfits" therefore took the field against Toulouse at the Arms Park with a primary school teacher (Evan Yardley), groundsman (Rowan Jenkins) and recruitment consultant (Alex Everett) amongst the part time players in the 23 man squad. Before a rowdy Arms Park crowd and Channel 4's cameras, the team performed admirably and beyond expectations before going down to an Antoine Dupont inspired Toulouse team.

The following week, a similar squad, now with "Rags" Backs Coach Dan Fish - who had only recently retired from professional rugby - at outside half played Harlequins at the Stoop. Tries by academy players Cameron Winnett and Theo Cabango meant that the game was tied at 17 all at half time before Harlequins finally took control of the game away from the "misfits" in the second half.  Fish's inspired performance was widely praised in the media and sealed his status as a cult hero among Cardiff supporters.

Colours
The traditional Cardiff RFC colours of blue and black were modelled on the colours used by Gonville and Caius College, Cambridge and remained in use by the team until 2006.

At that time, Cardiff Blues changed their playing strip in a decision widely interpreted as a move away from the old Cardiff RFC identity, as for the first time black was not included alongside the blue.

A variety of alternative colour designs have been used as change strips and for jerseys used in European rugby. A blue and gold jersey modelled on one worn by Aberdare RFC and created to raise money for the seriously injured Aberdare born Cardiff player Owen Williams proved popular and was worn in the 2018 European Challenge Cup final win in Bilbao.

Cardiff Rugby have now returned to their traditional colours of Cambridge blue and black, as of 2021.

Sponsorship
The following companies have produced kits for the Cardiff Blues or sponsored the side at some point in their history since 2003.

Home ground

Cardiff Arms Park has been owned by Cardiff Athletic Club since the 1920s and has long been considered Cardiff Rugby's spiritual home. From the late 19th century onward, the Arms Park hosted both a cricket ground and a rugby ground until the southern side of the site was sold to the WRU in 1968. The northern side of the Arms Park then became Cardiff Rugby Club's home stadium, while the southern side was to become first the National Stadium and later the Principality Stadium. Cardiff have moved high-profile fixtures "next door" on a number of occasions, such as the 2008–09 Heineken Cup semi-final versus Leicester Tigers.

The Arms Park currently consists of two main stands, both with seated and terraced sections. At the east and west ends of the stadium are blocks of hospitality facilities and office space. The Cardiff Athletic Clubhouse sits next to the South Stand.

For three seasons from the beginning of the 2009–10 season the first team moved to the new Cardiff City Stadium at Leckwith. Financial pressures and supporter dissatisfaction led to several home games being moved back to the Arms Park in the 2011–12 season. On 8 May 2012 it was announced that the 20-year lease with Cardiff City F.C. had been broken by mutual consent following significant financial losses incurred as a result of the move. The club returned to the Arms Park from the 2012/13 season.

For the conclusion of the abbreviated 2019/20 season, and the start of the 2020/21 season, due to the COVID-19 pandemic and the use of Cardiff Arms Park as part of the Dragons Heart emergency hospital, Cardiff played some home games behind closed doors at Rodney Parade in Newport. The club also returned to Cardiff City Stadium for two matches behind closed doors during this period.

In 2022, it was announced that an extension to the lease at Cardiff Arms Park had been signed with Cardiff Rugby's main shareholder, Cardiff Athletic Club. Cardiff Athletic Club are exploring options for a refurbishment and redevelopment of the Arms Park stadium and wider site.

Attendances

Total, average and highest attendances in all competitions. Friendlies are not included.

(Crowd figures from before 2004/5 are often estimated and incomplete and are therefore unreliable.)

Regional Responsibilities

Clubs and Schools

Cardiff Rugby are responsible for assisting the development of rugby in an area covering five unitary authorities: City of Cardiff, the Vale of Glamorgan, Rhondda Cynon Taff, Merthyr and southern Powys. This area includes 76 community clubs, 61 secondary schools and 320 Primary schools.

Tref-y-Clawdd RFC in Knighton on the border with Shropshire is the most northerly rugby club within this area, but the majority of clubs are based within the population centres of Cardiff and the communities to the immediate north and west of the city. They include Welsh Premiership clubs Merthyr RFC and Pontypridd RFC plus WRU Championship clubs Beddau RFC, Cardiff Metropolitan University RFC, Glamorgan Wanderers RFC and Ystrad Rhondda RFC  .

The club has close links with Coleg y Cymoedd, Cardiff and Vale College, Ysgol Gyfun Gymraeg Glantaf and Whitchurch High School, with all four playing in the WRU's elite Schools and Colleges League. The club has also formed a partnership with the fee paying Christ College Brecon and has formed links with Hartpury College in Gloucestershire.

The area also includes Cardiff Metropolitan University and Cardiff University, both leading University teams competing in BUCS Super Rugby in addition to the University of South Wales. Cardiff Academy players are often also students at these three universities.

Community Foundation
Cardiff Rugby Community Foundation are the charitable, not for profit community arm of the organisation. The Foundation delivers a range of programmes aimed at using rugby to make an impact upon communities both socially and economically.

Programmes include schools workshops, player visits, discounted rugby kits and rugby camps.

Age Group Rugby and Academy
At Under 16s level, two representative teams are selected (North and South) to compete in the RAG U16 Championship. At Under 18s level, Cardiff Rugby U18 compete in the RAG U18 league against similar teams from Scarlets, Ospreys, Dragons and RGC. Current Cardiff U18 Head Coach is Chad Mutyambizi.

High performing players from the U18 squad are offered Cardiff academy contracts. In recent years, the club has begun offering academy contracts to players at a younger age in an effort to retain players targeted by private schools and clubs in England.

The current Cardiff Academy manager is Gruff Rees who also serves as Director of Rugby of the Cardiff RFC Welsh Premiership team. Past graduates of the Cardiff academy system include Sam Warburton Jamie Roberts Tomos Williams Leigh Halfpenny Ellis Jenkins Josh Navidi and Rhys Patchell.

Ownership and management

Correct as of May 2022.

The ownership of Cardiff Rugby Ltd is held by a collection of shareholders, including the life president, Peter Thomas, Cardiff Athletic Club and numerous minority shareholders including shares managed by the Supporters Trust, CF10.

Current standings

United Rugby Championship

Coaching staff

Former head coaches

Current squad

Academy squad

Notable former players

Cardiff players who have won international caps for Wales.

Players to have won international caps with other countries:

British and Irish Lions
The following players have been selected to play for the British and Irish Lions touring squads while playing for Cardiff since 2003.

Results and statistics

Celtic League / Pro12 / Pro14 / United Rugby Championship

Celtic Cup

Heineken Cup / Rugby Champions Cup

European Rugby Challenge Cup

Anglo-Welsh Cup

EPCR milestones
In 2004 Cardiff Blues received the ERC Elite Award for having played 50 games in the Heineken Cup. This record began in 1995 when Cardiff RFC recorded an away draw at Bordeaux, and continued following the reorganisation of Welsh rugby in 2003.

As of 2022, Cardiff Rugby have played 124 matches in European Competition, making them joint 8th (with ASM Clermont Auvergne) on the all time list.

Rhys Williams has made more appearances for Cardiff in the top tier of European Cup Rugby than any other player with 78 appearances. Martyn Williams appeared 85 times in European competition, with 17 of his appearances coming with Pontypridd RFC.

Rhys Williams is also Cardiff's top try scorer in the competition with 22.

Club honours
Anglo-Welsh Cup – 2008–09
European Challenge Cup (2) – 2009–10 (first Welsh team to win a European Trophy), 2017–18

See also
 Rugby union in Wales
 Rugby in Cardiff

Notes

References

External links

 

 
Welsh rugby union teams
Rugby clubs established in 2003
Sport in Cardiff
United Rugby Championship teams